Florin Matei (born 8 December 1983), is a Romanian futsal player who plays for Fc Autobergamo Deva and the Romanian national futsal team.

References

External links 
 UEFA profile

1983 births
Living people
Romanian men's futsal players